Karasaz is a village in Raiymbek District, Almaty Region, south-eastern Kazakhstan. It is the administrative center of the Karasaz rural district (KATO code - 195851100). Population:

Geography 

References

Populated places in Almaty Region